Smales Farm busway station is a bus station in Westlake, New Zealand, on the Auckland Northern Busway. It opened on 2 February 2008, and is the second-closest busway station to Britomart Transport Centre. It has shelters, electronic real-time information on each platform, a customer service centre and passenger drop off and pick up.

It is adjacent to Westlake Girls High School and the Smales Farm Office Park, which houses Sovereign, Air New Zealand and Telstra Clear. North Shore Hospital is not far away.

The next station southbound is Akoranga busway station. The next northbound is Sunnynook busway station.

Buses travelling via the station include double-decker buses serving the Northern Express NX1 and NX2 routes.

Services
As of 20 February 2020, the following bus routes serve Smales Farm station: NX1, NX2, 866, 83, 845, 856, 871, 941, 842, 901, 906, 928.

Mahu City Express and SkyBus North Harbour Express service operating between both terminals at Auckland Airport and the Westfield Albany mall via the busway also stop here.

References

Northern Busway, Auckland
Bus stations in New Zealand
North Shore, New Zealand
Transport buildings and structures in the Auckland Region